The Baseball Network was an American short-lived television broadcasting joint venture between ABC, NBC and Major League Baseball (MLB). Under the arrangement, beginning in the 1994 season, the league produced its own broadcasts in-house which were then brokered to air on ABC and NBC. telecasts of games, The Baseball Network was the first television network in the United States to be owned by a professional sports league.

The package included coverage of games in prime time on selected nights throughout the regular season (under the branding Baseball Night in America), along with coverage of the postseason and the World Series. Unlike previous broadcasting arrangements with the league, there was no national "game of the week" during the regular season; these would be replaced by multiple weekly regional telecasts on certain nights of the week. Additionally, The Baseball Network had exclusive coverage windows; no other broadcaster could televise MLB games during the same night that The Baseball Network was televising games.

The arrangement did not last long; due to the effects of a players' strike on the remainder of the 1994 season, and poor reception from fans and critics over how the coverage was implemented, The Baseball Network was disbanded after the 1995 season. While NBC would maintain rights to certain games, the growing Fox network (having established its own sports division two years earlier in 1994) became the league's new national broadcast partner beginning in 1996.

Background

After the fallout from CBS's financial problems from their exclusive, four-year-long, US$1.8 billion television contract with Major League Baseball (a contract that ultimately cost the network approximately $500 million), Major League Baseball decided to go into the business of producing the telecasts themselves and market these to advertisers on its own. In reaction to the failed trial with CBS, Major League Baseball was desperately grasping for every available dollar. To put things into proper perspective, in 1991, the second year of the league's contract with the network, CBS reported a loss of around $169 million in the third quarter of the year. A decline in advertiser interest caused revenue from the sale of commercials during CBS's baseball telecasts to plummet. All the while, CBS was still contractually obligated to pay Major League Baseball around $260 million a year through 1993. Before Major League Baseball decided to seek the services of other networks, CBS offered US$120 million in annual rights fees over a two-year period, as well as advertising revenues in excess of $150 million a season.

As part of MLB's attempt to produce and market the games in-house, it hoped to provide games of regional interests to appropriate markets. Major League Baseball in the process, hoped to offer important games for divisional races to the overall market. Owners also hoped that this particular technique, combined with the additional division races created through league expansion (the Colorado Rockies and Florida Marlins had begun play the year prior) and the quest for wild card spots for the playoffs (1994 was the first year of three divisions for each league and the wild card) would increase the national broadcast revenue for Major League Baseball in the foreseeable future. On May 28, 1993, Major League Baseball's owners overwhelmingly approved a new network television deal without CBS involved.

After a four-year hiatus, ABC and NBC (who last aired Thursday Night Baseball games and the Saturday afternoon Game of the Week respectively) returned to Major League Baseball under the umbrella of a revenue sharing venture called The Baseball Network. Under a six-year plan (with an option for two additional years), Major League Baseball was intended to receive 85% of the first US$140 million in advertising revenue (or 87.5% of advertising revenues and corporate sponsorship from the games until sales topped a specified level), 50% of the next $30 million, and 80% of any additional money. Prior to this, Major League Baseball was projected to take a projected 55% cut in rights fees and receive a typical rights fee from the networks. When compared to the previous television deal with CBS, The Baseball Network was supposed to bring in 50% less of the broadcasting revenue. The advertisers were reportedly excited about the arrangement with The Baseball Network because the new package included several changes intended to boost ratings, especially among younger viewers.

Arranging broadcasts through The Baseball Network seemed, on the surface, to benefit NBC and ABC (who each contributed $10 million in start-up funds) since it gave them a monopoly on broadcasting Major League Baseball games. The deal was similar to a time-buy, instead of a traditional rights fee situation. It also stood to benefit the networks because they reduced the risk associated with purchasing the broadcast rights outright (in stark contrast to CBS's disastrous contract with Major League Baseball from the 1990–1993 seasons). NBC and ABC were to create a loss-free environment for each other and keep an emerging Fox, which had recently made an aggressive and ultimately successful $1.58 billion bid for the television rights for National Football Conference games (thus, becoming a major player in the sports broadcasting game in the process), at bay. As a result of Fox's NFL gain, CBS was weakened further by affiliate changes, as a number of stations jumped to Fox from CBS (for example, in Detroit, WWJ-TV replaced WJBK).

Key figures involved in the creation and production for The Baseball Network:

 David Alworth (vice president of broadcasting and production management)
 Dick Ebersol (president of NBC Sports)
 Eddie Einhorn (vice chairman of the Chicago White Sox, television producer and a member of Major League Baseball's television committee)
 John Filippelli (coordinating producer)
 Barry Frank (chief television negotiator)
 John Gonzalez (coordinating producer of baseball for NBC Sports)
 Bill Giles (Philadelphia Phillies president and chairman of Major League Baseball's television committee)
 Richard Levin (baseball spokesman)
 Ross Levinsohn
 Jon Litner (vice president of business affairs)
 Jack O'Hara (executive producer of ABC Sports)
 Andy Rosenberg (director of 1995 World Series, NBC Sports)
 Ken Schanzer (president and chief operating officer)
 Bud Selig (owner of the Milwaukee Brewers and acting commissioner of Major League Baseball)
 Ray Stallone (director of marketing communications)
 Bill Webb (director of 1995 World Series, ABC Sports)
 Tom Werner (owner of the San Diego Padres and a member of Major League Baseball's television committee)

This wasn't the first time that Major League Baseball considered creating its very own television network. Back in 1988, then commissioner Peter Ueberroth contemplated creating an all-baseball basic cable channel that would show as many as four games each night. Ueberroth wanted to set up a national cable package for one or two nights a week without undercutting the value of some teams' local television deals. This of course, would soon happen when Major League Baseball signed a deal to broadcast games on ESPN, but prior to this, Ueberroth envisioned the owners pooling games already being shown on regional pay-television services. Viewers would see (and pay for) the telecast of the team in their market if a game was scheduled; otherwise, they would be sent games of regional or divisional interest. Eventually, baseball could have also shared the channel with the NHL or NBA in the off-season. It wasn't until January 1, 2009 (nearly 14 years since the cancellation of the Baseball Network) that an all-baseball cable channel, MLB Network (created and backed by MLB) would finally come to fruition and would prove to be much more successful than the ill-fated Baseball Network.

Coverage
The Baseball Network kicked off its coverage on July 12, 1994 on NBC with the All-Star Game from Three Rivers Stadium in Pittsburgh. This was NBC's first telecast of a Major League Baseball game since Game 5 of the 1989 National League Championship Series between the San Francisco Giants and Chicago Cubs on October 9 of that year. The NBC broadcast team consisted of Bob Costas on play-by-play, with Joe Morgan and Bob Uecker as analysts. Costas, a veteran presence at NBC, had been the network's secondary baseball play-by-play announcer behind Vin Scully during the 1980s. Morgan, who was also working for ESPN at the time, had spent two years at NBC in the mid-1980s and two years at ABC from 1988 to 1989. Uecker, the longtime voice of the Milwaukee Brewers, returned to national television for the first time since he worked for ABC in the 1970s and early 1980s.

Greg Gumbel hosted the pre game show; this was one of his first assignments for NBC after having left CBS Sports following that network's coverage of the 1994 College World Series. Gumbel had also previously served as the secondary play-by-play announcer (behind Sean McDonough) for CBS's baseball coverage, calling the 1993 American League Championship Series along the way with Jim Kaat. Helping with interviews were Hannah Storm (reporting from the American League dugout) and Johnny Bench (reporting from the National League dugout). The 1994 All-Star Game reportedly sold out all its advertising slots. This was considered an impressive financial accomplishment, given that one 30-second spot cost US$300,000.

ABC, meanwhile, was able to have its primary broadcast team from 1989 return intact. Al Michaels served as the play-by-play announcer once again. Tim McCarver, who had just spent four years at CBS, returned as an analyst along with Jim Palmer. On the subject of Michaels returning to baseball for the first time since the Loma Prieta earthquake interrupted the 1989 World Series, Jim Palmer said, "Here Al is, having done five games since 1989, and steps right in. It's hard to comprehend how one guy could so amaze."

Baseball Night in America

After the All-Star Game was complete, ABC took over coverage with what was to be their weekly slate of games. ABC was scheduled to televise six regular season games on Saturdays or Mondays in prime time. NBC would then pick up where ABC left off by televising six more regular season Friday night games. Every Baseball Night in America game was scheduled to begin at 8 p.m. Eastern Time (or 8 p.m. Pacific Time if the game occurred on the West Coast). A single starting time gave the networks the opportunity to broadcast one game and then, simultaneously, cut to another game when there was a break in action.

The networks had exclusive rights for the twelve regular season dates, in that no regional or national cable service (such as ESPN or superstations like Chicago's WGN-TV or Atlanta's WTBS) or over-the-air broadcaster was allowed to telecast a Major League Baseball game on those dates. Baseball Night in America (which premiered on July 16, 1994) usually aired up to fourteen games based on the viewers' region (affiliates chose games of local interest to carry) as opposed to a traditional coast-to-coast format. Normally, announcers who represented each of the teams playing in the respective games were paired with each other. More specifically, on regional Saturday night broadcasts and all non-"national" broadcasts, TBN let the two lead announcers from the opposing teams call the games involving their teams together.

Games involving either of the two Canadian-based MLB teams at the time, the Toronto Blue Jays and Montreal Expos, were not always included in the Baseball Night in America package. Canadian rightsholders were allowed to broadcast the games. When TSN (which owned the cable rights to the Blue Jays and Expos) covered the games in Canada, they re-broadcast the BNIA feed across their network. Typically, if the Blue Jays were idle for the day, the Expos would be featured on TSN. Also, CBET (the CBC affiliate in Windsor, Ontario) would air Blue Jays games if the Detroit Tigers were not playing at home that night or if the Blue Jays were scheduled to play in Detroit. Whether or not the game would air in the opposing team's market would depend on which time zone they were from, or if they shared a market with another team.

All of the 1994 games aired on ABC; due to the strike NBC was unable to air its slate of games, which were supposed to begin on August 26.

Postseason coverage

In even-numbered years, NBC would have the rights to the All-Star Game and both League Championship Series while ABC would have the World Series and newly created Division Series. In odd-numbered years, the postseason and All-Star Game television rights were supposed to alternate. When ABC and NBC last covered baseball together from 1976 to 1989, ABC had the rights to the World Series in odd-numbered years while NBC would cover the All-Star Game and both League Championship Series in said years. Likewise, this process would alternate in even numbered years, with ABC getting the All-Star Game and both League Championship Series in years that NBC had the World Series.

The networks also promised not to begin any World Series weekend broadcasts after 7:20 p.m. Eastern Time. When CBS held the television rights, postseason games routinely aired on the East Coast at 8:30 p.m. at the earliest. This meant that Joe Carter's dramatic World Series clinching home run in 1993 occurred after midnight in the East. As CBS' baseball coverage progressed, the network dropped the 8 p.m. pregame coverage (in favor of airing sitcoms such as Evening Shade) before finally starting its coverage at 8:30 p.m. Eastern Time. The first pitch would generally arrive at approximately 8:45 p.m.

ABC won the rights to the first dibs at the World Series in August 1993 after ABC Sports president Dennis Swanson won a coin toss by calling "heads." Ken Schanzer, who was the CEO of The Baseball Network, handled the coin toss. Schanzer agreed to the coin toss by ABC and NBC at the outset as the means of determining the order in which they would divide up the playoffs.

What separated The Baseball Network from previous television deals with Major League Baseball, and was by far the most controversial part of the deal, was that not all postseason games (aside from the World Series) were guaranteed to be shown nationally. To increase viewership by preventing games from being played in the afternoon (the league was the only professional sports league in the country to play postseason games during the afternoon), the National League and American League's division and championship series games were instead played simultaneously in primetime, and affiliates could only air one game each night, which were again determined regionally. If one playoff series had already concluded, the remaining games would be aired nationally.

Ken Schanzer, The Baseball Network's president said "We've been given a responsibility to broadcast the games regionally and, within that context, we tried to come up with a plan that makes it as exciting as possible". On that end, The Baseball Network implemented a strategy that included cutting in to one game with highlights from other games—sometimes between batters, and more often, between pitches. Therefore, viewers watching one divisional series or League Championship Series game would often see action continuing on one reduced screen while a clip from another game is shown on another screen and vice versa. The theory was that by inserting highlights, even live action from other games, into the natural lulls, The Baseball Network could produce an exciting, technology-enhanced experience. Despite the frustration of not being able to see both League Championship Series on a national level, the 1995 LCS averaged a 13.1 rating.

Besides the 1994 All-Star Game and Game 6 of the 1995 World Series, arguably, the most famous Baseball Network broadcast was Game 5 of the 1995 American League Division Series between the New York Yankees and the Seattle Mariners, broadcast on ABC. It ended with the Mariners winning in 11 innings (via Edgar Martínez's game winning double), to clinch both their first postseason series win, and their first ever trip to the American League Championship Series. However, because the public would only be permitted to see one postseason game per day, the Division Series between the Mariners and Yankees would only be seen in its entirety by 20% of the country. Meanwhile, 30% could see the Braves-Rockies series, 27% could see the Reds-Dodgers series, and 23% could see the Red Sox-Indians series.

For example, in New York City, WNBC-TV broadcast the first two games of the Yankees-Mariners series, while WABC-TV aired the final three contests. In the neighboring Hartford–New Haven television market in Connecticut, NBC affiliate WVIT aired the first two games of the Boston–Cleveland series, but  ABC station WTNH would alternate with the Yankees in Game 3, the Red Sox in Game 4, and the Yankees in Game 5.

In Ohio, NBC stations in Cleveland, Steubenville, Columbus, Toledo, and Youngstown would get to see the Red Sox–Indians series. Viewers of WLWT in Cincinnati and all other cities would receive the Reds–Dodgers series. The remaining telecasts, on WSYX, the ABC affiliate in Columbus, would be of the Indians series. In South Dakota, viewers would get the Braves-Rockies series, while North Dakotans would have access to the Red Sox-Indians series. Only about 20% of the country in itself, had access of the 15-inning long second game of the Mariners-Yankees series.

Criticisms
A major problem with Baseball Night in America was the idea that viewers could not watch "important" games. Marty Noble put it in perspective by saying "With the Network determining when games will begin and which games are made available to which TV markets, Major League Baseball can conduct parts of its pennant races in relative secrecy." What added to the troubles of The Baseball Network was the fact that Baseball Night in America held exclusivity over every market. This most severely impacted markets with two teams, specifically New York City (Mets and Yankees), the Greater Los Angeles Area (Dodgers and Angels), Chicago (Cubs and White Sox), the San Francisco Bay Area (Giants and A's), and to a lesser extent Texas (Astros and Rangers). For example, if Baseball Night in America showed a Yankees game, this meant that nobody in New York could see that night's Mets game and vice versa.

Furthermore, Chicago's NBC affiliate, WMAQ-TV was unable to televise any Friday night Cubs game from Wrigley Field. Even though Wrigley Field had lights installed and was capable of holding night games since 1988, a city ordinance at the time, prohibited regular season Friday and Saturday night games to be played there. The Baseball Network regardless, owned the broadcasting rights to those entire dates.
 
Things got so bad for The Baseball Network that even local broadcasters objected to its operations. KSMO-TV in Kansas City, the primary over-the-air station for the Kansas City Royals, went as far as to sue the Royals for breach of contract resulting from their broadcasts being "overexposed" and violating its territorial exclusivity. Worse yet, even if a market had only one team, the ABC or NBC affiliate could still not broadcast that team's game if the start time was not appropriate for the time zone. For example, if the Detroit Tigers (the only team in their market) played a road game in Seattle, Oakland or Anaheim beginning at 8 p.m. Pacific Time (a late game), Detroit's Baseball Network affiliate (either WXYZ-TV or WDIV, depending on the network which held the rights to the game) could not air the game because the start time was too late for the Detroit area (11 p.m. Eastern Time). Detroit viewers only had the option of viewing the early game of the night.

Sports Illustrated columnist Tom Verducci for one, was very harsh on The Baseball Network, dubbing it both "America's regional pastime" and an "abomination." ABC Sports president Dennis Swanson, in announcing the dissolution of The Baseball Network, said "The fact of the matter is, Major League Baseball seems incapable at this point in time, of living with any long term relationships, whether it's with fans, with players, with the political community in Washington, with the advertising community here in Manhattan, or with its TV partners."

While on assignment at the 1993 World Series, CBS Sports broadcaster Sean McDonough told the New York Times that The Baseball Network's strategy of regionalizing the playoffs irked him because with both League Championship Series now being played simultaneously, no market would be able see both games; rather, the two playoff series would be regionalized into areas of natural interest. The only exception would be Games 6 and 7 of the two series, which would have staggered starting times. McDonough said that certainly didn't account for people who move. McDonough added that if a Boston native like him moved to Atlanta and the Red Sox were in the playoffs (which would incidentally, actually happen under the watch of The Baseball Network in 1995), then it was too bad. He also believed that his call of Sid Bream's slide to clinch the National League pennant for the Atlanta Braves in Game 7 of the 1992 National League Championship Series against the Pittsburgh Pirates, wouldn't have had the impact if you couldn't see the whole game, to see what led up to it. To put things into further perspective, McDonough believed that even with a staggered starting time from the American League Championship Series game, many fans would not have seen parts of Game 7 of the 1992 NLCS had it been broadcast under The Baseball Network's regionalized plan.

Shortly after the start of the strike, Stanford University's Roger Noll argued that the Baseball Network deal (and the bargain-basement ESPN cable renewal, which went from $100 million to $42 million because of their losses) reflected "poor business judgment on the part of management about the long-run attractiveness of their product to national broadcasters." He added that the $140 million that owners expected to share for the 1994 season (before the strike) from TBN was underestimated by "one-third to one-half" and fell below the annual average of $165 million needed to renew the TBN deal after two years. Meanwhile, Andy Zimbalist, author of Baseball and Billions, and a players' union consulting economist, insisted that baseball could have done better than the TBN deal with some combination of CBS (which offered $120 million last-ditch bid for renewal), Fox and TBS. Baseball shut out CBS and could have waited longer before closing them out."

Five years after The Baseball Network dissolved, NBC Sports play-by-play announcer Bob Costas wrote in his book Fair Ball: A Fan's Case for Baseball that The Baseball Network was "stupid and an abomination." Costas further wrote that the agreement involving the World Series being the only instance of The Baseball Network broadcasting a nationally televised game was an unprecedented surrender of prestige, as well as a slap to all serious fans. He also acknowledged that the most impassioned fans in baseball were now prevented from watching many of the playoff games that they wanted to see, as all playoff games had been broadcast nationally for decades. Costas added that both the divisional series and the League Championship Series now merited scarcely higher priority than regional coverage provided for a Big Ten football game between Wisconsin and Michigan. When Costas was preparing call the 1995 American League Division Series between Boston-Cleveland for NBC, he told the New York Times that "It's baseball's objective to market itself nationally, but TBN makes it a local sport." Costas added "Baseball says the wild card is supposed to save baseball, but TBN shows you as little as possible."

According to Curt Smith's book, The Voice – Mel Allen's Untold Story, the longtime New York Yankees broadcaster and This Week in Baseball host was quoted as saying "You wonder how anything would be worse [than CBS]. What kind of show cancels a twenty-six-week-season's first fourteen weeks?" (in response to TBN's tagline, "Welcome to the Show").

During the 1995 Division Series, the fan frustration with The Baseball Network was so bad that the mere mention of it during the Mariners–Yankees ALDS from public address announcer Tom Hutyler at Seattle's Kingdome brought boos from most of the crowd. To further put things into perspective, 55% of the country was able to get the American League Championship Series (Cleveland-Seattle) while 45% got the National League Championship Series (Atlanta-Cincinnati) for at least the first two games on ABC.

Production overview
While ABC and NBC would provide some production personnel and their own announcers for the games, all of would be coordinated from the office of Ken Schanzer, the chief executive officer of The Baseball Network and former executive vice president for NBC Sports. The graphics, camera placements, and audio quality were intended on looking and sounding about the same on both networks.

When critiquing The Baseball Network's coverage of the 1995 postseason, Jerry Trecker of the Hartford Courant wrote that the broadcasts suffered from having too many men in the booth, sloppy camera work, and a lack of consistency in graphics. Trecker also felt that the ABC and NBC crews during the World Series, spent too much time in story-telling and not enough in nuts-and-bolts game setup. Instead, the coverage according to Trecker, proceeded as if fans have followed the game with the same attention as in the past. As for the graphics, Trecker argued that not only were the game graphics provided by The Baseball Network not there all the time as was the case with ESPN's, but it was too big.

Trecker would however, praise ABC's production of the 1995 All-Star Game in Arlington. He said that the broadcast crew of Al Michaels, Jim Palmer, and Tim McCarver paced their broadcast as if they had never been away, and the different looks, especially ground level cameras, had always been a trademark of effective work by ABC. ABC also according to him, made effective use of graphics to recap season leaders. ABC Sports' technical coverage as a whole, included 21 cameras from all vantage points, including one in the Goodyear Blimp, and an unmanned camera directly above home plate. Coaches would wear wireless microphones.

Trecker did however, point out that times, the broadcasters seemed to be ahead of the production people, especially when they wanted to talk about Raul Mondesi's speed getting to a drive into the right field corner. They never showed it. Trecker also believed that ABC's usage of dugout reporters (in this case, Lesley Visser, John Saunders, and Rick Dempsey), even in showcase games like the All-Star Game, was overkill. Visser in particular, was singled out for asked such lengthy questions of Los Angeles Dodgers pitcher Hideo Nomo that it was almost farcical when his answers came back in translation.

For the 1995 World Series, ABC and NBC shared 17 cameras and 13 tape machines, two of the "Super Slo-Mo" variety.

Sponsorships
Among the key sponsors for The Baseball Network were Anheuser-Busch, MCI Inc., Sherwin-Williams, Texaco, and Russell Athletic. The sponsorship with Anheuser-Busch in particular, was worth over $20 million for two years with an option of a third. Budweiser was announced as the presenter during the starting line-up were announcements during The Baseball Network's telecasts. According to Busch Media president Tony Ponturo, Anheuser-Busch liked The Baseball Network's idea of broadcasting games, including the Division Series and League Championship Series regionally instead of to the entire nation all at once.

Other sponsors for The Baseball Network included Gillette, Avis (who paid The Baseball Network approximately $6.5 million), Chevrolet, Fruit of the Loom, Gatorade, General Motors (who was expected to pay The Baseball Network at least $40 million), Upper Deck, and Toyota. Chevrolet in particular, sponsored the "player of the game" award that would be announced towards the end of the telecasts.

All in all, The Baseball Network was said to have more than 20 corporate sponsors and advertisers. In the event of a strike, these sponsors either had the option of taking back the money that they otherwise, would've used to support The Baseball Network and be able to spend it elsewhere or, they would've been able to delay any spending on baseball telecasts until the strike was resolved. At the time of the actual strike's start on August 12, 1994, The Baseball Network was reportedly able to sell approximately $130 million in advertisement time. Unfortunately, about $100 million of that was expected to run through the entire postseason, including the World Series, which would ultimately be canceled on September 14, 1994.

Downfall and demise
The long-term plans for The Baseball Network began to crumble after players and owners went on strike on August 12, 1994. In addition to the cancellation of that year's World Series, ABC was denied its remaining Baseball Night in America telecasts and NBC was shut out of its game broadcast slate (which in 1994, was scheduled to begin on August 26) altogether. It is known that ABC's lead broadcast team of Al Michaels, Jim Palmer, and Tim McCarver were scheduled to broadcast a game between the Chicago Cubs and Los Angeles Dodgers the week that the strike began.

Both networks elected to dissolve the partnership with Major League Baseball on June 22, 1995. Both networks figured that as the delayed 1995 baseball season opened without a labor agreement, there was no guarantee against another strike. Under the terms of the agreement, it could be voided by any party if the venture did not produce a minimum of $330 million in revenue over the first two years.

ABC Sports president Dennis Swanson, in announcing the dissolution of 
The Baseball Network, said: 

Others would argue that a primary reason for its failure was its abandoning of localized markets in favor of more lucrative and stable advertising contracts afforded by turning to a national model of broadcasting, similar to the National Football League's television package, which focuses on localized games, with one or two "national" games.

The Baseball Network's contract stipulated that negotiations could only take place with NBC and ABC for 45 days, starting on August 15, 1995. But with NBC and ABC's refusal to continue after the 1995 season, baseball had to look at its future options. In October 1995, when it was a known fact that ABC and NBC were going to end their television deal/joint venture with Major League Baseball, preliminary talks rose about CBS returning. It was rumored that CBS would show Thursday night games (more specifically, a package of West Coast interleague games scheduled for the 11:30 Eastern/8:30 Pacific Time slot) while Fox would show Saturday afternoon games. CBS and Fox were also rumored to share rights to the postseason. In the end, however, CBS's involvement did not come to pass and NBC became Fox's over-the-air national television partner. Whereas each team earned about $14 million in 1990 under CBS, the later television agreement with NBC and Fox beginning in 1996 earned each team about $6.8 million.

To salvage the remains of the partnership, ABC and NBC elected to share coverage of the 1995 postseason including the World Series. ABC wound up broadcasting Games 1, 4, and 5 of 1995 World Series while NBC would broadcast Games 2, 3, and 6 (which turned out to be the decisive game). Had the 1995 World Series gone to a seventh game, it would have then been broadcast by ABC. Game 5 of the 1995 World Series was the final Major League Baseball game to be broadcast on ABC until the 2020 postseason.

Al Michaels would later write in his 2014 autobiography You Can't Make This Up: Miracles, Memories, and the Perfect Marriage of Sports and Television that the competition between the two networks could be so juvenile that neither ABC nor NBC wanted to promote each other's telecasts during the 1995 World Series. To give you a better idea, in the middle of Game 1, Michaels was handed a promo that read "Join us here on ABC for Game 4 in Cleveland on Wednesday night and for Game 5 if necessary, Thursday." Michaels however, would soon follow this up by saying "By the way, if you're wondering about Games 2 and 3, I can't tell you exactly where you can see them, but here's a hint: Last night, Bob Costas, Bob Uecker, and Joe Morgan [NBC's broadcast crew] were spotted in Underground Atlanta." Naturally, Bob Costas soon made a similar reference to ABC's crew (Michaels, Jim Palmer, and Tim McCarver) on NBC.

Aftermath
In the end, the venture lost US$95 million in advertising and nearly $500 million in national and local spending. The Baseball Network generated only about $5.5 million per team in revenue for each of the two years that it operated. To put things into proper perspective, in 1993 alone, CBS generated about $14.7 million per team. Much of this could possibly be traced back to the strike causing a huge drop in revenue, which in return caused baseball salaries to decrease by approximately $140,000 on average in 1995.

Both ABC and NBC soon publicly vowed to cut all ties with Major League Baseball for the remainder of the 20th century, and Fox signed on to be the exclusive network carrier of Major League Baseball regular season games in 1996. However, NBC kept a postseason-only, with the exception of even-numbered years when NBC had the rights to the All-Star Game deal in the end, signing a deal to carry three Division Series games, one half of the League Championship Series (the ALCS in even numbered years and the NLCS in odd numbered years; Fox televised the other LCS in said years), and the 1997 and 1999 World Series respectively (Fox had exclusive rights to the 1996, 1998 and 2000 World Series). Beginning in 2001, Fox became the exclusive broadcast network for the World Series.

Fox's end of the new contract (which the network paid US$575 million for the initial five-year contract) restored the Saturday afternoon Game of the Week broadcasts during the regular season (approximately 16 weekly telecasts annually that normally began on Memorial Day weekend), although it continued to offer a selection of games based on region, with usually three regionalized telecasts airing each week.

With ABC being sold to The Walt Disney Company in 1996, ESPN picked up daytime and late-evening Division Series games with a provision similar to its National Football League games, in which the games would only air on network affiliates in the local markets of the two participating teams. ESPN's Major League Baseball contract was not affected then, but would take a hit in 1998 with the new National Football League contract. It was rumored that ABC would only offer Major League Baseball about $10 to $15 million less per year than what CBS was reportedly willing to offer for the 1996 season. At the time, it was reported that Major League Baseball was expecting a combined total of over $900 million in rights fees from two networks.

In 2012, Fox would revive the Baseball Night in America title (previously used for The Baseball Network's games) for a series of Saturday night games. Unlike The Baseball Network, Fox did not carry every game that was scheduled for a given Saturday, only choosing five to six games to distribute to its affiliates.

As far as the primary announce teams for The Baseball Network were concerned, they mostly went their separate ways. Al Michaels remained at ABC until 2006 (his final assignment for ABC Sports was Super Bowl XL), when he moved to NBC to become the voice of their Sunday night NFL coverage. Tim McCarver joined Fox as its primary analyst alongside Joe Buck and stayed there until his retirement from national television broadcasts in 2013. Jim Palmer, meanwhile, would rejoin the Orioles as their television analyst, where he still remains.

NBC's primary crew remained in place for two more years. Bob Uecker would leave following the 1997 World Series, but Bob Costas and Joe Morgan would continue calling games until NBC's contract expired following the 2000 season. The network's final game at the time, was Game 6 of the 2000 American League Championship Series. Major League Baseball coverage would ultimately return to NBC in 2022 via a deal with the network's streaming service, Peacock. Costas has since become the lead broadcaster for MLB Network (as previously alluded towards, MLB Network's self-produced, live MLB Showcase telecasts could be seen as a spiritual successor to The Baseball Network's broadcasts), while Morgan kept working for ESPN until the end of the 2010 season.

On July 8, 2011, Al Michaels and Bob Costas teamed up (with the two announcers alternating between play-by-play and color commentary) to call a game between the New York Mets and San Francisco Giants on MLB Network. It was Michaels' first appearance as a primary announcer on a baseball telecast since Game 5 of the 1995 World Series on ABC (as previously mentioned, Michaels had called Games 1, 4 and 5 of that series with Jim Palmer and Tim McCarver, while Costas called Games 2, 3 and 6 with Joe Morgan and Bob Uecker for NBC). Michaels and Costas also made appearances on SportsNet New York and Comcast SportsNet Bay Area during the game's middle innings, since the MLB Network broadcast was blacked out in the Mets' and Giants' respective home markets.

On September 28, 2020, it was announced that ABC would carry at least four Wild Card Series games for the expanded 2020 Major League Baseball postseason. Produced by ESPN, they marked ABC's first national MLB broadcasts since 1995. And then on July 7, 2021, ESPN announced that a Sunday Night Baseball game between the Chicago Cubs and Chicago White Sox, scheduled for August 8 from Wrigley Field would air exclusively on ABC. This was the first regular season Major League Baseball game to be aired on ABC since August 19, 1995. It was also announced that Al Michaels, would join in on the broadcast via FaceTime during the fourth inning.

Announcers

As previously mentioned announcers who represented each of the teams playing in the respective games were typically paired with each other during games on regular season Baseball Night in America telecasts. For example, if a game featuring the Texas Rangers playing against the Chicago White Sox aired on Baseball Night in America, then a local Rangers announcer like Steve Busby would announce the broadcast with a local White Sox announcer like Ken "Hawk" Harrelson. In effect, ABC and NBC had to contract many non in-house announcers due to so many games being regionally televised.

Also as previously mentioned, ABC used Al Michaels, Jim Palmer, Tim McCarver, and Lesley Visser as the lead broadcast team (Brent Musburger, CBS alumnus Jim Kaat, and Jack Arute became the secondary team for ABC). Meanwhile, NBC used Bob Costas, Joe Morgan, Bob Uecker, and Jim Gray as their lead broadcasting team. John Saunders was the studio host for ABC's Baseball Night in America coverage. Hannah Storm hosted NBC's studio show for the lone season in which the network was able to participate in The Baseball Network; Greg Gumbel was NBC's studio host for its coverage of the 1994 All-Star Game (as previously mentioned). In 1995, Gumbel became the secondary play-by-play announcer for NBC (working with Joe Morgan on the National League Championship Series) behind Bob Costas. Dick Enberg was supposed to be the secondary play-by-play announcer in 1994 for NBC, but by the following season, his other commitments for NBC such as golf and football rendered him unavailable to broadcast baseball.

Likewise, the original plan would've called for Costas to work with Uecker and for Enberg to work with Morgan on Baseball Night in America telecasts during the regular season and early round postseason games. When the question aroused regarding why NBC didn't rehire Costas' old broadcast partner, Tony Kubek (for whom Costas worked with on the Game of the Week and NBC's bi-yearly coverage of the ALCS from 1983–1989), it was insinuated that Kubek was simply too independent-minded for NBC officials to tolerate. According to Costas, while he originally wanted to work with Kubek again, NBC simply wanted to go into a different direction after being away from baseball for nearly five years.

Prior to Game 3 of the 1995 World Series, Cleveland Indians slugger Albert Belle unleashed a profanity-laced tirade at NBC reporter Hannah Storm as she was waiting in the Indians' dugout for a prearranged interview with Indians lead-off man, Kenny Lofton. On the same day, Belle snapped at a photographer near the first base line during batting practice. Belle was ultimately fined US$50,000 for his behavior towards Storm. This particular World Series was remembered for baseball television history being made twice by Storm. Prior to Game 2, she became the first female sportscaster to serve as solo host of a World Series game, and after Game 6, she would be the first female sportscaster to preside over the presentation of the Commissioner's Trophy to the World Series champions.

Notable calls
1995 American League Division Series:

1995 National League Division Series:

1995 American League Championship Series:

1995 National League Championship Series:

1995 World Series:

Ratings
Ratings for both seasons of the Baseball Night in America regular season coverage were substantially higher than CBS's final season in 1993 (3.8) or any subsequent season on Fox. Baseball Night in America earned a 6.2 during the strike-shortened 1994 season and a 5.8 in 1995.

All-Star Game

1995 World Series

See also
 1994 Major League Baseball All-Star Game
 1994–95 Major League Baseball strike
 1994 World Series
 1995 Major League Baseball All-Star Game
 1995 American League Division Series
 The Double (Seattle Mariners)
 1995 National League Division Series
 1995 American League Championship Series
 1995 National League Championship Series
 1995 World Series

References

External links
Baseball Night In America: The Worst Idea Ever
Articles about Baseball Network – Baltimore Sun
Searchable Network TV Broadcasts

Television channels and stations established in 1994
Television channels and stations disestablished in 1995
1994 Major League Baseball season
1995 Major League Baseball season
Major League Baseball on television
Defunct television networks in the United States
Joint ventures
ABC Sports
Major League Baseball on NBC
Simulcasts
1994 establishments in the United States